Gymnocalycium amerhauseri is a species of Gymnocalycium from Argentina.

References

External links
 
 

amerhauseri
Flora of Argentina